Helmut Käser (14 November 1912 – 11 May 1994) served as the Secretary General of FIFA, the international governing body of association football, from April 1960 to June 1981. He served under three presidents of FIFA, Englishmen Arthur Drewry (1955–1961) and Stanley Rous (1961–1974), and under Brazilian João Havelange from 1974 to 1981.

Käser was succeeded by Sepp Blatter. Two months after Käser was forced to retire from FIFA, Blatter married Käser's daughter, Barbara. That means, by 1981, Blatter had taken his father-in-law's job as well as his daughter (Käser did not attend the wedding).

Käser was an officer of the Swiss army; he worked as a civil servant in Switzerland at the Federal Department of Economic Affairs and became the general secretary of the Swiss Football Association in May 1942. He died in 1994 in Küssnacht near Zurich.

References

1912 births
1994 deaths
FIFA officials
People from Alb-Donau-Kreis
People from Zürich
Swiss military officers
20th-century Swiss lawyers